The Muscatine Avenue Moffitt Cottage Historic District is a National Register of Historic Places district that includes five stone cottages in Iowa City epitomizing the eccentric vernacular architectural style of Howard Moffitt. Moffitt constructed more than 100 houses in Iowa City and Coralville, Iowa and a few in Citrus City, Texas. These small houses represent one of the regional 20th century vernacular architectural styles in the United States.  Howard Moffitt was a prolific builder.

Howard Moffitt
Howard Francis Moffitt was a prolific builder, constructing between 100 and 200 homes in Iowa City and Coralville between 1924 and 1943. With no formal training in construction or architecture, Moffitt began building homes as a side business from his auto parts distributorship. Moffitt's house designs appear to have been concocted from magazine photos, consultation with friends, limitations of available building supplies, and whimsy. In 1943 Moffitt moved to Citrus City, Texas, and attempted to reproduce his success there, however only seven or eight houses were built in Texas. Moffitt's Iowa City houses appear to be a response to increasing demand for affordable small houses, especially rental houses, in the growing university town.

The Moffitt house style
No two Moffitt houses are identical. Moffitt's building style was so eclectic that there are many homes in Iowa City in which there is no sure way to determine if Moffitt built them; his building records do not survive. "These mystical dwellings look as if Germanic elves constructed houses for Irish pixies", is how one writer described them. In general Moffitt houses borrow heavily from the English Cottage and American Craftsman styles of architecture, although there are examples of Moffitt building in styles reminiscent of southwestern stucco adobe and Prairie School styles. Several of his houses have concave or hipped roof. While there is no single architectural aspect that includes all Moffitt houses, there are some common design and decoration schemes that are commonly seen in Moffitt houses. These include:
 Large tapering chimney
 Steeply-peaked roofs and dormers
 Built-in small garages (uncommon in such small houses)
 Spindle porch columns
 Copious use of recycled material (trolley track rails used as main supports; chair backs used as decoration; reused brick, stone, timber, barnboard, and nails).
 Multiple levels inside the structure
 Exterior mix of shingle, stone, brick, stucco, and wood siding, often on the same structure; brick and stone often laid in irregular or whimsical patterns; cladding is often patchwork.
 Structural problems such as bowed floors and plumbing and electrical work encased in plaster
 Use of a cellulosic insulation treated to be fireproof
 Concrete aggregates that include found stone, broken glass

References

Photo Gallery of Moffitt Houses, Iowa City

External links

National Register of Historic Places in Iowa City, Iowa
Vernacular architecture in Iowa
Historic districts in Iowa City, Iowa
Historic districts on the National Register of Historic Places in Iowa
Houses in Iowa City, Iowa